Ben Ryan  (born 11 September 1971) is an English sports coach who is best known for coaching the Fiji sevens team to a gold medal in sevens rugby at the 2016 Rio Olympics. He is currently Director of Elite Performance at association football club Brentford.

As Fiji's sevens coach from 2013 to 2016, he guided the team to their first ever Dubai 7's title, and set the record of tournament titles won by a Fiji Sevens coach with nine. He coached Fiji to win the inaugural rugby sevens competition at the 2016 Summer Olympics. The gold medal was the first ever medal won by Fiji at any Olympics.[1]

He is also a former coach of the England sevens team.

Youth and education

Ryan was educated at Strand on the Green Junior School and at Wimbledon College. He is a former member of Thames Valley Harriers Athletic Club, where he was a successful sprinter at school boy level.

He graduated from Loughborough University with a BSc in Sports science and Cambridge University (MPhil in Education), where he won two Blues as a scrum-half in the Varsity Match-winning sides of 1995 and 1996 as well as captaining the Light Blues’ Sevens team. He is a former teacher at St Edward's School, Oxford where he was master in charge of rugby and athletics.

He played club rugby with Nottingham and West Hartlepool.

Coaching career

He taught at St Edward's School, Oxford which, by the time he left after six years, had a player in every England international squad from Under-16 to Senior. Previously the school had no representation on international teams. He joined Newbury Blues in 2002 as backs coach and led them from National Division Two to One (Championship) in 2004–05 (his first season as full-time Director of Rugby). He was assistant coach to England Counties on their tour to Argentina and Uruguay in 2005 and head coach for the 35–7 victory over Tunisia in June 2007, and against Ireland Clubs and France Amateurs in March 2007.

England Sevens

Ryan's first IRB tournament as England Sevens coach was Wellington in 2007, and up to the Dubai Sevens 2012 he was in charge for 56 HSBC IRB World Series Sevens Tournaments, over 300 games – the longest serving England Sevens head coach – and reached the semi finals or better 28 times. Outside the HSBC World Sevens Series he was also head coach for the 2009 RWC and 2010 Commonwealth Games in Delhi and in his last tournament in charge of England led them to their first Rugby World Cup 7's Final in 20 years, losing to New Zealand in the final.

In the FIRA European Series, he coached 7 tournaments and overall coached England in 67 international tournaments, a total of 378 games. In 2011, Ryan was also in charge of the England side that won the Junior Commonwealth Games in the Isle of Man, beating South Africa in the final 41–20.

In August 2013, he resigned as the coach of the England Sevens team and was replaced by Simon Amor.

Fiji Sevens

In September 2013, Ryan was signed as the coach for the Fiji Sevens team. He led them to victory in the Dubai 7s for the first time in the nation's history in only his second tournament in charge. His appointment also coincided with financial problems for the Fijian Rugby Union, resulting in Ryan's volunteering to go unpaid for several months of his contract.

As coach of Fiji, Ryan won nine World Sevens Series tournaments – two in the 2013–14 season and four in 2014–15, overtaking the record set by former coach Waisale Serevi, who won four Cup titles with Fiji. Fiji won three more tournaments in the 2015–16 season.

In May 2015, Fiji were crowned the overall winners of the 2014–15 Sevens World Series after defeating South Africa in the cup quarter final of the 2015 London Sevens, giving Ryan his first ever Sevens World Series title.

At the 2016 Summer Olympics, Ryan coached Fiji to a gold medal in the rugby sevens competition, where the team earned Fiji's first ever medal in the history of the Olympics.

Ryan confirmed that he would be stepping down as coach in 2016, but had not made any plans for the future. In August 2016, he was given the Fijian name Ratu Peni Rayani Latianara, along with three acres of land in Serua.

Other roles 

Ryan has served France sevens as a consultant and runs his own consultancy business. He has worked as Technical Director of Rugby X and is an ambassador for Play-Ex Sports, HSBC and Fiji Airways. In June 2022, Ryan moved into association football when he was appointed to the newly-created role of Director of Elite Performance at Premier League club Brentford.

Honours and awards

After winning gold and returning to Fiji, Ryan was accorded the highest order when he was awarded the Companion of the Order of Fiji. He is depicted on the reverse of a circulating 50 cent coin, and on the front of a circulating commemorative $7 banknote.

Personal life

Ryan married Natalie Peck on 4 July 2009. They separated in September 2016 and were officially divorced on 2 August 2017. They had no children. In April 2022, he got engaged to Michelle Ackerley. Ryan is a Brentford supporter and was a season ticket holder at the club.

References

External links

England stars pay tribute to Ryan

A tale of two coaches
Inside England’s Sevens World Series campaign with Ben Ryan
Revealed – rugby's secret science lab
Life on the Sevens circuit: an insiders view from Ben Ryan
England hope Stevens is their lucky number in Las Vegas
Ben Ryan's ″Sevens Heaven: The Beautiful Chaos of Fiji's Olympic Dream″  wins Sports Book of the Year 2019

1971 births
Living people
English rugby union coaches
English rugby union players
Alumni of Loughborough University
Alumni of the University of Cambridge
Companions of the Order of Fiji
People educated at St Benedict's School, Ealing
People educated at Wimbledon College
Cambridge University R.U.F.C. players
Rugby union scrum-halves
Coaches of international rugby sevens teams
English expatriates in Fiji
Rugby union players from Wimbledon
Brentford F.C. non-playing staff